Mother's Day is a 2016 American romantic dramedy film directed by Garry Marshall and written by Marshall, Tom Hines, Lily Hollander, Anya Kochoff-Romano, and Matt Walker. It features an ensemble cast including; Jennifer Aniston, Kate Hudson, Shay Mitchell, Julia Roberts, Jason Sudeikis, Timothy Olyphant, Britt Robertson, Jack Whitehall, Héctor Elizondo, and Margo Martindale. Filming began on August 18, 2015, in Atlanta. It was the final film of Marshall's career prior to his death in July 2016 as well as the final film appearance of his sister Penny before her death in December 2018.

Mother's Day was theatrically released in the United States on April 29, 2016 by Open Road Films. It was panned by critics and grossed $48 million worldwide. At the 37th Golden Raspberry Awards, Roberts and Hudson received nominations for Worst Actress and Worst Supporting Actress respectively.

Plot

As Mother's Day nears, a group of seemingly-unconnected people in Atlanta come to terms with their relationships with their mothers.

Sandy is a divorced mother of two sons, Mikey and Peter, whose ex-husband, Henry has recently remarried a younger woman, Tina. Still getting used to this, she meets Bradley, a former marine, in the supermarket. Bradley's wife Dana, a Marine Lieutenant, died a year ago, leaving him with their two daughters, Vicky and Rachel. They all miss her terribly.

Kristin, adopted from birth, has her own daughter, Katie and mulls over marrying the father of her child, Zack. She considers her life incomplete and her friend Jesse encourages her to search for her birth mother. Jesse also happens to be Sandy's best friend.

Jesse and her sister Gabi have their own issues with their parents, who they feel are too racist and homophobic to be in their lives: Jesse is married and has a son, Tanner with Russell, who is not white. Gabi is married to her girlfriend Max and has a son, Charlie. When their parents, Earl and Florence suddenly show up, plenty of catching-up is in order.

As she's in Atlanta promoting her latest book, Miranda, an accomplished author and television personality, gets a surprise visit from Kristin, who is her daughter who she was forced to give her up for adoption at birth, as she was very young. Their making up leads to Kristin asking Zach to marry her on air and marrying on the same day, so Miranda can participate.

Jesse and Gabi's parents ambush them and their partners on their camper-van, and with Russell's mom's help through Skype, force him to make up with Jesse. Later on, the families including his mom, who flies in from Vegas, celebrate Mother's Day with a picnic in the park.

Sandy and Bradley meet again by chance in the hospital. She's there because of her younger son's asthma attack, he because of a mishap in the Mother's Day party he was throwing which ended with his going to the hospital for a broken leg. Helping her get unstuck from a vending machine, combined with his daughters' encouragement, Bradley finally starts to see her in a positive light.

Cast

Production

Development
In April 2013, Dennis Dugan confirmed that he would next develop Garry Marshall's comedy film Mother's Day.

Casting
On June 30, 2015, four cast members were announced, Julia Roberts, Jennifer Aniston, Kate Hudson, and Jason Sudeikis. The film was directed by Garry Marshall and scripted by Anya Kochoff-Romano and Lily Hollander. Brandt Andersen produced, along with Wayne Rice and Mike Karz. On July 22, 2015, Open Road Films acquired US distribution rights to the film and it was revealed that Matt Walker and Tom Hines would co-write the script. On August 21, 2015, Ella Anderson joined the film's cast to play Vicky, Sudeikis' character's daughter. On August 26, 2015, Timothy Olyphant, Britt Robertson, Shay Mitchell, Jack Whitehall, Loni Love, and Aasif Mandvi joined the cast. On October 6, Hilary Duff was confirmed to appear, but she declined due to scheduling conflicts with filming the second season of her show Younger.

Filming
Principal photography on the film began on August 18, 2015, in Atlanta. Though shooting her part required only four days, Julia Roberts was paid $3 million.

Release
Mother's Day was released domestically on April 29, 2016 by Open Road Films.

Reception

Box office
Mother's Day grossed $32.5 million in the United States and Canada, and $16.3 million in other territories, for a worldwide total of $48.8 million, against a production budget of $25 million.

In the United States and Canada, the film was released alongside Keanu and Ratchet & Clank, and was projected to gross around $11 million from 3,035 theaters in its opening weekend. The film grossed $2.6 million on its first day and $8.4 million in its opening weekend, finishing 4th at the box office, behind The Jungle Book ($43.7 million), The Huntsman: Winter's War ($9.6 million), and Keanu ($9.5 million). In its second weekend, which coincided with the holiday, the film grossed $11.1 million (an increase of 32.5%), finishing 3rd at the box office, behind Captain America: Civil War ($179.1 million) and The Jungle Book ($24.5 million).

Critical response
On review aggregator website Rotten Tomatoes, the film has an approval rating of 8% based on 157 reviews and an average rating of 2.9/10. The site's critical consensus reads, "Arguably well-intended yet thoroughly misguided, Mother's Day is the cinematic equivalent of a last-minute gift that only underscores its embarrassing lack of effort." On Metacritic, the film has a score of 18 out of 100 based on 30 critics, indicating "overwhelming dislike". Audiences polled by CinemaScore gave the film an average grade of "B+" on an A+ to F scale.

Richard Roeper gave the film zero out of four stars, saying, "...nothing could have prepared us for the offensively stupid, shamelessly manipulative, ridiculously predictable and hopelessly dated crapfest that is Mother's Day."

Peter Bradshaw, writing in The Guardian, gave the film one star out of five, calling it "as feelgood and life-affirming as a fire in an asbestos factory neighbouring a children's hospital."

Accolades

References

External links
 
 
 
 

2016 films
2016 LGBT-related films
2016 romantic comedy-drama films
2010s American films
2010s English-language films
American LGBT-related films
American romantic comedy-drama films
Films about families
Films about mother–daughter relationships
Films directed by Garry Marshall
Films scored by John Debney
Films shot in Atlanta
Gulfstream Pictures films
LGBT-related romantic comedy-drama films
Mother's Day
Open Road Films films